John Newton Harman Sr. (June 10, 1854 – September 21, 1934) was an American politician who served as a member of the Virginia Senate.

He was a founder and teacher at Tazewell College and publisher of a newspaper called The Primitive Baptist.

References

External links
 
 

1854 births
1934 deaths
Republican Party Virginia state senators
20th-century American politicians